Eldon may refer to:

Places

Australia
 Eldon Range, Tasmania, a mountain range

Canada
 Eldon, Alberta, a locality
 Eldon Parish, New Brunswick
 Eldon Township, Ontario, a former municipality
 Eldon, Ontario, a former railway stop
 Eldon, Prince Edward Island, 
 Rural Municipality of Eldon No. 471, Saskatchewan

United Kingdom
 Eldon, County Durham, England, a village
 Eldon Hill, Derbyshire, England
 Eldon Square, Newcastle upon Tyne, England

United States
 Eldon, Iowa, a city
 Eldon, Missouri, a city
 Eldon Township, Benson County, North Dakota
 Eldon, Oklahoma, a census-designated place
 Eldon, Washington, an unincorporated community

People
 Eldon (given name)
 Eldon (surname)

Businesses
 Eldon Group, a product manufacturer headquartered in Madrid
 Eldon Insurance, a United Kingdom insurance company
 Eldon (toy company), a defunct business based in California

Other uses
 Earl of Eldon, a title in the Peerage of the United Kingdom
 Eldon (mango), a mango cultivar originating in Miami, Florida

See also 
 Eldon Lane, County Durham, England
 Eldon Square (disambiguation)
 Old Eldon, County Durham, England
 Elden (disambiguation)
 Eldin (disambiguation)